Chaetotaxy is the arrangement of bristles (macrochaetae) on an arthropod or annelid, or taxonomy based on their position and size. For example, it is important in Diptera, in which group it was formalised by Ernst August Girschner. The term chaetotaxy was later proposed by Carl Robert Osten-Sacken.

The chaetotaxy of  a fly might include :- acrostichal, dorsocentral, humeral, mesopleural, sternopleural, notopleural, postalar, supraalar and scutellar bristles on the thorax; dorsal, posterodorsal, anterodorsal, ventral, posteroventral and anteroventral bristles on the legs and ocellar, orbital, postvertical, vibrissal, outer vertical and inner vertical bristles on the head.

Chaetotaxy is also used in determining homology in certain morphological traits, as well as providing information about the phylogeny between taxa. For example, chaetotaxy has been used to clarify evolutionary relationships in Collembola, as well as identify new species.

References
Capinera, J.L. (editor). 2008. Encyclopedia of Entomology, 2nd Edition. Vols. 1-4. Springer, Dordrecht, The Netherlands. .
McAlpine, J.F. 1981 Morphology and terminology - Adults. - In: McAlpine, J.P. et al. (eds.): Manual of Nearctic Diptera, vol. 1; p. 9-63 - Ottawa: Research Branch, Agriculture Canada, Monograph 27.
Steyskal, G.C. (1976) The terminology of bristles on the upper back of the head in the higher Diptera. Journal of the Kansas Entomological Society 49 (2): 155-159.

External links
CSIRO Anatomy atlas
Chaetotaxy of Asilidae
TOL Description of the family Clusiidae including chaetotaxy.

See also

Morphology of Diptera

Insect morphology